DnaJ homolog subfamily C member 11 is a protein that in humans is encoded by the DNAJC11 gene.

References

Further reading

Heat shock proteins